Rhododendron orbiculare, the round-leaved rhododendron, is a species of flowering plant in the heath family Ericaceae that is native to forests and slopes at an elevation of  in northeastern Guangxi and southwestern Sichuan, China.

In cultivation in the UK Rhododendron orbiculare has gained the Royal Horticultural Society’s Award of Garden Merit. It is hardy down to  but like most rhododendrons it requires a sheltered spot in dappled shade, and an acid soil enriched with leaf mould.

References 

orbiculare
Taxa named by Joseph Decaisne